FK Dukla Prague is a Czech association football club located in the Dejvice area of Prague. It currently plays in the Czech National Football League.

The club played in local competitions between 2001 and 2007, when it gained entry to the country's second league. A four-year spell in the second league followed, culminating in the club winning the league in 2011 and being promoted to the Czech First League, where it remained until relegation in 2019.

History
The club was founded in 1958 as FK Dukla Dejvice and advanced to the Prague Championship in the 1983–84 season. Prior to 2001, the club's best finish in a season had been second in the Prague Championship in the 1984–85 season. In 2001 the club became known as FK Dukla Prague, but not the legal successor of the original Dukla Prague team, which had merged in 1996 to finally become 1. FK Příbram.

The club finished 14th in the 2001–02 Prague Championship and in the same position the following season. Petr Benetka led the club to the league title in 2003–04, signalling a return for the club to the Prague Championship. The club finished in second place in the 2004–05 season but 13th the following season. In April 2006, Dukla's president Milan Doruška promised that the club would rise up the league system. In November 2006, Dukla Prague management announced that it had agreed to a takeover of second league rights of the Jakubčovice team and in 2007 Dukla took Jakubčovice's place in the Czech 2. Liga, having finished the 2006–07 season in second place.

Dukla Prague played in the Czech 2. Liga from the 2007–08 season, playing their first 2. Liga match on 4 August 2007, which they lost to Opava by a 2–1 scoreline. After four seasons they won the division and gained promotion to the top flight for the 2011–12 season.

Club symbols and references
The club wear yellow and red, the traditional colours of the club. In October 2008, the club wore black shirts in a league match against Most to commemorate the death of Josef Hájek, the man responsible for the return of league football to Dukla.

In 1986, British band Half Man Half Biscuit released "All I Want for Christmas is a Dukla Prague Away Kit" as a B-side to their single  "The Trumpton Riots." The song has since become a favourite of fans, later appearing on The Trumpton Riots EP and reissues of Back in the DHSS, creating both a demand for Dukla Prague kits and a group of supporters of the club amongst the band's fanbase.

Stadium

Dukla play home matches at Stadion Juliska in the Dejvice area of Prague. Occasionally the club has used other stadiums, for example in 2011 Dukla used nearby Stadion Evžena Rošického for two matches due to redevelopment work at Juliska.

Club records
Competitive matches only. Records are for professional matches only (Czech 2. Liga and higher).
Record victory: 6–0 v Fulnek, Czech 2. Liga, 13 March 2009
Record defeat: 0–6 v Jablonec, Czech First League, 3 October 2014

Players

Current squad
.

Out on loan

Notable former players

Reserves
As of 2019/20, Dukla's reserve team FK Dukla Prague B plays in the Bohemian Football League (3rd tier of Czech football system).

Current technical staff
.

Managers
The following individuals have managed the club since 2001.

 Eduard Jůza (2001–2002)
 Jaromír Jarůšek (2002)
 Jan Nový (2002)
 Radomír Sokol (2002–2003)
 Pavel Korejčík (2003)
 Radomír Sokol (2003)
 Petr Benetka (2003–2005)
 Jan Berger (2005)
 Salem Hebousse (2005–2006)

 Günter Bittengel (2006–2009)
 Luboš Kozel (2009–2016)
 Jaroslav Šilhavý (2016)
 Jaroslav Hynek (2016–2018)
 Pavel Drsek (2018)
 Roman Skuhravý (2018–2021)
 Bohuslav Pilný (2021–2022)
 Petr Rada (2022–)

History in domestic competitions

 Seasons spent at Level 1 of the football league system: 8
 Seasons spent at Level 2 of the football league system: 6
 Seasons spent at Level 3 of the football league system: 0
 Seasons spent at Level 4 of the football league system: 0

Czech Republic

Honours
Czech 2. Liga
Champions: 2010–11

References

Bibliography
Pivoda, Aleš. Legenda se vrátila Praha: MAC, 2013. 157 p.

External links

  
 Profile at UEFA.com
 FK Dukla Prague at the website of the Prague Football Association 

Football clubs in the Czech Republic
Football clubs in Prague
Association football clubs established in 1958
Czech First League clubs
Football
1958 establishments in Czechoslovakia
FK Dukla Prague